Fireball XL5 is a 1960s British children's science-fiction puppet television series about the missions of Fireball XL5, a vessel of the World Space Patrol that polices the cosmos in the year 2062. Commanded by Colonel Steve Zodiac, XL5 defends Earth from interstellar threats while encountering a wide variety of alien civilisations.

Inspired by the Space Race, Fireball XL5 was created by the husband-and-wife team of Gerry and Sylvia Anderson and filmed by their production company AP Films (APF) for ITC Entertainment. It was APF's final black-and-white series and the third to be made in what the Andersons dubbed "Supermarionation": a style of production in which the characters were played by electronic marionettes whose mouth movements were synchronised with the voice actors' pre-recorded dialogue. Zodiac was voiced by Paul Maxwell while two of his companions – XL5 co-pilot Robert the Robot and "space doctor" Venus – were voiced by Gerry and Sylvia Anderson themselves. The series' scale model special effects were directed by Derek Meddings.

Filming of Fireball XL5s 39 half-hour episodes began in February 1962 and the series premiered on ATV London (part of the ITV network) on 28 October that year. It was also purchased by NBC in the United States, becoming the only Anderson series to air on an American network. The TV episodes were supplemented by an audio play, comic strips in TV Comic and TV Century 21, and other tie-ins including books, toys and model kits. The series was regularly repeated on British TV until 1974 and has since been released on DVD in the UK, US, Canada and Australia.

Regarded by some commentators as a space opera or space Western, Fireball XL5 has been praised for its music; its closing theme – "Fireball", sung by Don Spencer – was commercially released to moderate success in the UK charts. It is often confused with Space Patrol, a puppet series with a similar premise that was made by the Andersons' former collaborators Roberta Leigh and Arthur Provis.

Premise
Set in the year 2062, the series follows the missions of Earth spaceship Fireball XL5, commanded by Colonel Steve Zodiac of the World Space Patrol (WSP). Zodiac's crew comprises Dr Venus, an authority on space medicine; engineer and navigator Professor Matthew Matic; and co-pilot Robert: a transparent, anthropomorphic robot who often exclaims "ON-OUR-WAY-'OME!" as XL5 returns to base.

XL5 patrols Sector 25 of charted interstellar space and is one of at least 30 "Fireball XL" vessels (an XL30 is mentioned in the episode "The Firefighters"). The ship has a "gravity activator" for artificial gravity and consists of two detachable sections. A winged nose cone dubbed Fireball Junior houses the cockpit and serves as a self-contained short take-off and vertical landing craft for exploring planets. The main, larger section contains a navigation bay, laboratory, workshops, lounge and crew quarters, together with the rocket motors that enable interstellar travel. On arrival at an alien world, the main section usually remains in orbit while Fireball Junior travels down to the surface.

The WSP is based at Space City, located on an unnamed island in the South Pacific Ocean. The organisation is headed by Commander Zero, assisted by Lieutenant Ninety. For unspecified reasons, the city's 25-storey, T-shaped control tower is seen to rotate (in one episode, a character accidentally causes it to turn fast enough for those inside to suffer vertigo). XL5s deep-space patrols are missions of three months' duration; between missions, the ship is on call at Space City. The ship blasts off from a mile-long launch rail ending in a 40-degree incline. On its return to Space City, it lands vertically in a horizontal attitude using underside-mounted retro-rockets.

Until the episode "Faster Than Light", XL5 travels through space at sub-light speeds. Its rocket motors, powered by a "nutomic" reactor, provide a maximum safe speed of "Space Velocity 7", allowing the ship to reach the outlying star systems of charted space within a few months. The crew do not wear spacesuits outside the ship: instead, they take "oxygen pills" to survive the vacuum while using thruster packs to manoeuvre. The ship's "neutroni" radio enables virtually instantaneous communication with Space City and other space vessels over vast distances.

Episodes

Characters

Regular
 Colonel Steve Zodiac (voiced by Paul Maxwell): the pilot and commanding officer of Fireball XL5. In the episode "Space City Special" he is declared "Astronaut of the Year".
 Doctor Venus (voiced by Sylvia Anderson): a doctor of space medicine, of French origin. Zodiac personally selected her to be a member of the XL5 crew. According to the episode "The Last of the Zanadus", Venus has served on the ship for five years.
 Professor Matthew "Matt" Matic (voiced by David Graham): XL5s engineer, navigator and science officer.
 Robert the Robot (voiced by an uncredited Gerry Anderson through an artificial larynx): the co-pilot of XL5, a transparent robot invented by Professor Matic and Earth's most advanced mechanical man.
 Zoonie the Lazoon (voiced by David Graham): Venus' lazy, semi-telepathic pet from planet Colevio. During his early appearances, he can say no more than "welcome home". His vocabulary expands as the series progresses, often due to him mimicking other characters.
 Commander Wilbur Zero (voiced by John Bluthal): the operational commander-in-chief of the World Space Patrol and chief controller of Space City. Despite his gruff exterior, he shows great respect and care for his subordinates, especially Zodiac. Zero's rank appears to be above that of Colonel but below that of Space General.
 Lieutenant Ninety (voiced by David Graham): Space City's assistant controller. He is young, inexperienced and the one most often on the receiving end of Commander Zero's scathing attitude (although Zero also refers to him as "the best lieutenant Space City has"). In one episode he is shown training to be an XL pilot.

Recurring
 Jock Campbell (voiced by John Bluthal): Space City's chief engineer, of Scottish origin.
 Eleanor and Jonathan Zero (both voiced by Sylvia Anderson): Commander Zero's wife and young son.
 Captain Ken Ross (voiced by John Bluthal): pilot of Fireball XL7.  He often needs rescuing by the XL5 crew.
 Mr and Mrs Boris and Griselda Space Spy (voiced by David Graham and Sylvia Anderson): a villainous husband-and-wife pair of Russian origin who first appear in the episode "Spy in Space".
 The Subterrains (voiced by John Bluthal and David Graham): a race of hostile aliens from Planet 46.

Production
After making Supercar, production company AP Films (APF) presented its investor – Lew Grade of Associated Television – with two ideas for a follow-up series. One of these, titled Century 21 (the original name of the spaceship), was commissioned and produced as Fireball XL5. The rejected proposal, Joe 90, was about a boy called Joe who dreams of carrying out daring space missions as an astronaut codenamed "Joe 90". Unlike Century 21, this concept had a hybrid format – the fantasy sequences being filmed with puppets while the framing stories used live actors. The only creative element shared by the two ideas was the character of Professor Matic. APF would not revisit Joe 90 until 1967, when it developed a series of that title that bore little resemblance to the original idea.

Century 21 drew inspiration from the Space Race of the early 1960s. Despite its title, it was originally to have been set in the 30th century, in the year 2962. This was subsequently changed to 2062. At the same time, the "United States Space Patrol" became the "World Space Patrol" and the name of Colonel Zodiac's spaceship (as well as the series itself) was changed first to Nova X 100, then Fireball XL5. The "XL" of the final title was taken from "Castrol XL" engine oil. Thirty-seven of the series' 39 episodes were written by Alan Fennell, Anthony Marriott or Dennis Spooner, all newcomers to the APF productions. (Spooner, however, had submitted unfilmed scripts for Supercar.) Script supervision was performed by series co-creators and voice artists Gerry and Sylvia Anderson, who also wrote the first episode ("Planet 46") and "Space Monster".

Filming at APF's studios on the Slough Trading Estate began in February 1962. Three stages were used: two for puppet filming (permanent sets on one stage, one-offs on the other) and another for special effects. To speed up production, two puppet filming units were created to allow episodes to be shot in pairs by different crews, who alternated on the first two stages while the effects crew used the third. The production of each episode consisted of a week's principal photography on the main puppet stage followed by inserts-filming on the secondary stage, coinciding with two weeks of effects shooting. After a unit vacated one of the puppet stages, it was set up for the other unit to start or resume filming on another episode.

Characters and voice-recording
The concept brochure for Century 21 described Colonel Zodiac and Dr Venus as the "Mr and Miss America" of 2962. Venus' face was modelled on her voice actor, Sylvia Anderson. Character dialogue was recorded at a studio in Borehamwood. 

Robert the Robot had a Perspex body with a head adapted from a plastic tumbler. He was the only regular in a Gerry Anderson puppet series to be voiced by Anderson himself, who "spoke" the robot's lines (as well as those of supporting robot characters) through an artificial larynx. As remembered by Anderson in a deleted scene of the documentary Filmed in Supermarionation (2014):

Anderson also noted that due to the silent or aspirate nature of the letter "h", the larynx did not register its vocalisation; thus, Robert's customary cry of "On our way home!" was rendered as "ON-OUR-WAY-'OME!". Daniel O'Brien, author of SF:UK – How British Science Fiction Changed the World, describes Robert as a "very English homage" to the character Robby the Robot from the 1956 film Forbidden Planet.

Effects and music
After working on the Andersons' earlier productions as a contractor, effects director Derek Meddings became a full-time employee of APF and formed his own unit with Brian Johnson as his assistant. According to Meddings, some of the more action-packed episodes featured as many as "40 to 50" effects shots. The rotating Space City control tower, whose filming model was made of wood and card, was inspired by contemporary revolving restaurants. Fireball XL5 was the first TV series to employ front projection-based visual effects.

The XL5 spaceship was designed by associate producer and former APF art director Reg Hill. XL5s rocket sled launch was based on rumoured Soviet plans to fire craft into space on a track ending in a ramp. Although the 1951 film When Worlds Collide had featured a similar concept, Gerry Anderson denied that XL5s launch method was copied from this. During the filming of the launch sequence, XL5 was pulled down its rail on wires by a technician running along a platform above the set. Fast cutting was employed to conceal the shaking of the model. Some of the series' rocket sound effects were created by recording a jet plane at a nearby airfield.

The Jetmobiles – personal hovercraft that the XL5 crew use to explore the surfaces of planets – were conceived as a way of limiting the number of scenes that showed the characters walking, thus helping to conceal their lack of realistic articulation. Originally the vehicles were to have been rocket-powered; however, tests with miniature explosives proved too destructive so the method of propulsion was changed. The characters of APF's later series Stingray and Thunderbirds use vehicles similar to the Jetmobiles.

The opening theme music features saxophones as well as series composer Barry Gray's first use of an Ondes Martenot. The closing theme song – "Fireball", arranged by Charles Blackwell and performed by Don Spencer – was a minor hit in the UK. It spent 12 weeks in the country's music charts, peaking at number 32 in March 1963.

Broadcast and reception
Fireball XL5 was the only Anderson series to be sold to a US network: NBC, which aired it as parts of its Saturday morning children's block from 1963 to September 1965. In the UK, the series was regularly repeated on the ITV network until 1974, followed by an additional re-run in 1985.

Critical response
According to Jim Sangster and Paul Condon, authors of Collins Telly Guide, "the sheer ambition of the show is its charm." Matthew Millheiser of review website DVD Talk praises the series: "Fireball XL5 might be kitschy, might be chock-full of scientific inaccuracies and glaring anachronisms that was par-for-the-course for cheesy sci-fi of the time, and even might have a few clunker episodes in the mix. But the care, innovation, and sheer imagination in each episode are positively infectious." He goes on to describe the series as "simple, clean, clearly delineated fun" and "the perfect type of children's entertainment: it doesn't talk down to its audience, it doesn't bog down the characters with a faux sophistication or glib hipness, and it has enough dazzle, charm, and imagination to make the show enjoyable and entertaining for adults." For Anthony Clark, Fireball XL5 "marks the start of the truly great Anderson-produced puppet show [...] [W]hen you sprinkle the episodes with humour, lace them with action and tie them up with Barry Gray's fantastic music, the result transcends the show's rudimentaries, transforming it into something enduringly special." Comparing it to the Andersons' follow-up, Stingray, which he considers to be very similar, Clark describes Fireball XL5 as "[p]erhaps [...] a little more playful and a little less slick, but what it lacks in polish it more than makes up for in energy and pace."

According to Paul Mavis of DVD Talk, the series is "not as ambitious ideas-wise" as Stingray yet "still charms, thanks to its simple yet nicely designed production and that velvety, strangely ethereal black-and-white world it creates." He also states that "while there aren't nearly as many elaborate 'hardware' set-ups as later Anderson outings [...] the budget-imposed simplicity adds an amusingly ironic, sleek modernist tone" to the series. In contrast, Stuart Galbraith IV describes the "hardware" as "pretty retro even by 1962 standards", adding that the overall production "looks more like Rocky Jones, Space Ranger than Thunderbirds." On the writing, he notes that while earlier episodes are mostly "strange-planet/Earth-under-threat-type stories", there is an increasing focus on character development as the series progresses. Mavis argues that the characters are limited by the fact that they were purposely conceived as "action/adventure stereotypes". On the writing generally, he considers the "old-school comic book"-style plots to be "less sophisticated than the production design, frequently falling into the same pattern: the UN-like World Space Patrol recognizes a threat from an alien civilisation, sending in Steve Zodiac and team to neutralise it ... before almost getting themselves killed."

For John Peel, Fireball XL5 is one of several APF series to feature capable female characters who are weakened by negative gender stereotypes. Peel describes medical expert Dr Venus as being "relegated to secondary chores", calling this an example of "standard Anderson sexism". Writing for Decider.com, Meghan O'Keefe praises Fireball XL5s humour and special effects but criticises the series' "almost incomprehensible level of misogyny [...] Dr Venus is criticised for not fetching coffee fast enough and later, when she praises Steve's heroism, he replies, 'Thanks, I think you're cute, too.'" O'Keefe also comments that the series "doesn't seem concerned with the morality or the larger social implications of space travel. Just as Dr Venus is constantly written off as a woman, the aliens we meet speak an uncomfortably foreign language and are painted as maniacal terrorists willing to go on suicide missions to destroy Earth [...] There's no nuance, but then, that clearly wasn't the goal. Anderson was clearly trying to make an entertaining show, and it's very, very amusing."

Ian Fryer characterises the series as a Space Western, arguing that Steve Zodiac essentially plays the role of an interstellar sheriff. Fryer also compares David Graham's voice for Professor Matic to that of Western actor "Gabby" Hayes and the French-born Venus to Marlene Dietrich as Frenchy in the film Destry Rides Again (1939). According to Fryer, the series adapts Western stock characters to create an air of "warmth and familiarity".

The series' music has been positively received. According to Clark, the closing theme song's opening lyric, "I wish I was a spaceman", had a "timely resonance" for audiences of the early Space Age. Describing the series overall as "better than a lot of live-action movies", Mark Voger of NJ.com argues that the music "would be at home in any live-action thriller."

Tie-ins and home video
The TV series was supplemented by an audio play, Journey to the Moon, which was produced by APF in association with Pye Records. Written by Alan Fennell and released as a 7-inch vinyl EP in February 1965, this was a semi-educational adventure about a sleeping boy who has a dream in which he meets the XL5 crew, who teach him about spaceflight and the Apollo programme. Patrick Moore was scientific advisor on the production.

Fireball XL5 also spawned tie-ins including toys, an MPC playset with rocket ship and figures, model kits, puppets, ray guns, water pistols, comic strips, and annuals. A black-and-white comic strip, drawn by Neville Main, was printed in TV Comic from 1962 to 1964. In January 1965, the strip moved to the newly-launched TV Century 21 comic, where it remained for the next five years. The comics adventures, written by Tod Sullivan and drawn by Mike Noble, were printed in colour until 1968, when it evolved into a text feature. Four annuals, featuring comic strips and text stories, were published by Collins between 1963 and 1966. The Fireball XL5 strips from TV Century 21 were reprinted in Countdown (later named TV Action) in 1971 and 1972 and again in Engale Marketing's Action 21 in 1988 and 1989. In the US, Gold Key Comics published a single-issue comic book in 1963; the following year, Little Golden Books published a colour illustrated storybook which was released in the UK under the title Fireball XL5 – A Big Television Book.

The series was released on Region 1 DVD by A&E Home Video in 2003. A Region 2 box set with new bonus material was released in 2009, superseding a 2004 version which had no extras. Also in 2009, a colourised version of the episode "A Day in the Life of a Space General" was released on Blu-ray Disc. In 2021, Network Distributing released the full series on Blu-ray.

Translations
  : Fusée XL5
  : El Capitán Marte y el XL5. In the version shown in Latin American countries, Colonel Zodiac is called Capitán Marte ("Captain Mars")
  : Πύρινη Σφαίρα (Pyrine Sphaera = Ball of Fire)
  : 宇宙船XL-5 (Uchuusen XL-5 = Spaceship XL-5)

References

Works cited

External links

Fireball XL5 at the official Gerry Anderson website

1960s British children's television series
1960s British science fiction television series
1962 British television series debuts
1963 British television series endings
AP Films
Black-and-white British television shows
British children's action television series
British children's adventure television series
British children's science fiction television series
British television shows featuring puppetry
English-language television shows
Fictional spacecraft
ITV children's television shows
Marionette films
NBC original programming
Robots in television
Space adventure television series
Space opera television series
Space Western television series
Television series about extraterrestrial life
Television series by ITC Entertainment
Television series set in the 2060s
Television series set on fictional islands
Television series set on fictional planets
Television shows adapted into comics